Cleveland National Forest encompasses 460,000 acres, mostly of chaparral, with a few riparian areas. A warm dry mediterranean climate prevails over the forest. It is the southernmost U.S. National Forest of California. It is administered by the U.S. Forest Service, a government agency within the United States Department of Agriculture. It is divided into the Descanso, Palomar and Trabuco Ranger Districts and is located in the counties of San Diego, Riverside, and Orange.

History 
The Kumeyaay, Payómkawichum, Cahuilla, and Cupeño long inhabited various areas of the forest. They lived on various forms of food, including acorns and local wildlife. Many of the Cleveland National Forest's trails are built following the routes developed by these Indigenous peoples.

Cleveland National Forest was created on July 1, 1908 with the consolidation of Trabuco Canyon National Reserve and San Jacinto National Reserve by President Theodore Roosevelt and named after former President Grover Cleveland.

In 1964, a bid to reclaim 25 acres of the forest was made by Clarence H. Lobo. After California Mission Indians were offered $29.1 Million Dollars by the US Federal Government in 1964 "to settle tribal land claims" regarding 70 million acres of land, Lobo rejected this offer, since it valued an acre of native land at 47 cents and did not account for unratified treaties. Lobo responded by sending $12.50 to President Lyndon B. Johnson for 25 acres of the Cleveland National Forest (at 50 cents per acre), and set up a camp at the site (the Upper San Juan Campground).

The Cleveland National Forest was the site of the 2003 Cedar Fire, which was the largest wildland fire in California history. It started in the forest when a hunter became lost and lit a fire to signal for help. The fire quickly spread to 62,000 acres.

The Santiago Fire of 2007 burned 6,701 acres of the forest, while subsequent fires that year burned thousands of more acres.

Districts
 Trabuco Ranger District – the northernmost area
 Consists of most of the Santa Ana Mountains and is bisected by the Ortega Highway, which runs from San Juan Capistrano to Lake Elsinore. Its northern border is Corona.
 Palomar Ranger District – near Escondido and Ramona
 Includes the "Highway to the Stars" from State Route 76 to the top of Palomar Mountain.
 Descanso Ranger District – east of Alpine
 Includes Sunrise Highway, a National Scenic Byway.

Use restrictions
A National Forest Adventure Pass is required for parking in designated areas of the Cleveland National Forest as well as other National Forests in Southern California, and may be obtained from local merchants, visitor centers, or online.

Available on the Cleveland National Forest Official Site under Current Conditions are road, campground, picnic area, and trail closures.

"Law Enforcement Activities" are a common reason given for closures in the southern portion of the forest.  These closures are implemented to limit back road access in hopes of circumnavigating US Border Patrol checkpoints.  Bear Valley Road coming up from Buckman Springs, Kitchen Creek Road and Thing Valley Road are among routes that are routinely restricted.

Elevated fire restrictions were announced in August 2020.

Activities
Popular activities include picnic areas, hiking through the mountains on foot, exploring on horseback, trail running, trail mountain biking, camping overnight or driving on the Sunrise Scenic Highway. The Forest also includes Corral Canyon and Wildomar Off-Highway Vehicle Areas.

Besides climbers and wildlife advocates, the Forest also accommodates the needs of telecommunications companies, hunters, campers, utilities, off-road-vehicle enthusiasts, hikers, horse riders, neighbors and others.

Camping
 Campgrounds – The Cleveland National Forest has campgrounds available at the Descanso, Palomar, and Trabuco Ranger District. Sites normally serve 6-8 persons and 2 vehicles.
 Group camping  – Group campgrounds are available.
 Remote camping – Visitor's permits are required.

Hiking trails
 Sunset Trail - Sunset Trail is a 4.6 mile loop trail accessible from Meadows Trailhead off Sunrise Highway, mile marker 19.1. The trail, which offers several connection options, winds through pine forest leading one to open meadows, ponds and small lakes, and a popular lookout to the Pacific Ocean. The surrounding habitat supports numerous flora and fauna including native black oaks, Engelmann oaks, giant Jeffrey pines, Acorn Woodpeckers (Melanerpes formicivorus), hawks and turkey vultures. Dogs are not allowed off leash.
Big Laguna Trail - Starting nearby the Laguna Campground in the Descanso District is a 10 mile loop that connects to the Sunset Trail and the Nobel Canyon trail. The perennial Little Laguna Lake is featured on this trail.
Garnet Peak Trail - This trail features viewpoints of the Anza Borrego Desert at 6000 feet in elevation. It starts at the Garnet Peak Trailhead, but can also be accessed via the Penny Pines Trailhead which connects with the Pacific Crest Trail before joining the Garnet Peak trail.

Observatories
 Mount Laguna Observatory

Fire lookout towers
There are currently two operational fire lookout towers in the Cleveland National Forest.
 High Point Lookout, Cleveland National Forest, Palomar Mountain
 Los Pinos Lookout, Cleveland National Forest, near Lake Morena
 Boucher Hill Lookout: While this fire lookout tower is also on Palomar Mountain, it actually sits inside the Palomar Mountain State Park and not the Cleveland National Forest. It is an operational tower and works in conjunction with the USFS but is owned by the State of California and is an historic building.

Wilderness areas
There are 4 official wilderness areas in Cleveland National Forest that are part of the National Wilderness Preservation System. One of them extends into land that is managed by the Bureau of Land Management.
 Agua Tibia Wilderness (partly BLM)
 Hauser Wilderness
 Pine Creek Wilderness
 San Mateo Canyon Wilderness

Flora and fauna
Cleveland National Forest is home to many wildlife species such as mountain lion, bobcat, mule deer, coyote, gray fox, ringtail cat, long-tailed weasel, opossum, black-tailed jackrabbits, desert cottontails, California ground squirrel, and many other small species. A wildlife corridor is being created between the Cleveland National Forest and Orange County’s wild coastal terrains to ensure that animals can retreat fire safely if needed.

See also
 California chaparral and woodlands
 California montane chaparral and woodlands
 California oak woodlands

References

External links

 Cleveland National Forest Official Site
 In-depth article by the San Diego Historical Society
 Southern California Trails at Local Hikes
 The Nature Conservancy: Santa Ana Mountains
 Santa Ana Mountains Wild Heritage Project
 Center For Biological Diversity
 Santa Ana Mountains Natural History Association

 
National Forests of California
Protected areas of Orange County, California
Protected areas of Riverside County, California
Protected areas of San Diego County, California
Parks in Southern California
.
Cuyamaca Mountains
Laguna Mountains
Palomar Mountains
Santa Ana Mountains
Protected areas established in 1908
1908 establishments in California
Protected areas of Southern California